Chonburi station is a railway station located Ban Suan Subdistrict, Chonburi City, Chonburi. It is a class 1 railway station  from Bangkok railway station. The station opened in July 1989 as part of the Eastern Line Chachoengsao Junction–Sattahip Port section.

Train services 
 Ordinary train No. 283/284 Bangkok–Ban Phlu Ta Luang–Bangkok
 Rapid train No. 997/998 Bangkok–Ban Phlu Ta Luang–Bangkok (weekend only)

References 
 
 
 

Railway stations in Thailand
Railway stations opened in 1989
1989 establishments in Thailand
Chonburi province